Ünye (Oinòe, Οἰνόη in ancient Greek) is a large town and district of Ordu Province in the Black Sea region of Turkey, 76 km west of the city of Ordu. In 2009 it had 74,806 inhabitants. İrfan Akar is the President of the Chamber of Commerce and Industry of Ünye, which is one of the important trade centers of the Black Sea region. Osman Sarıkahraman is the President of the Unye Chamber of Agriculture.

Geography

Ünye has a little port, in a bay on one of the flatter areas of the Black Sea coast. The climate is typical of the Black Sea region, warm and wet,  although because the hinterland is flatter than most of the coastline Ünye has less rainfall. Agriculture is the basis of the local economy, in particular hazelnut growing, hazelnut trading and hazelnut processing. The town is very quiet in late-July and August when most people are in the countryside for the hazelnut harvest.

The town of Ünye provides high schools, higher education and other services to the surrounding countryside, and other industry includes a large cement factory, flour mills, local handicrafts and the port. The town has grown in recent decades, acquiring the multi-storey concrete blocks spreading along the coast, typical of so many Turkish towns. There are cafes and internet cafes popular with students. The cuisine includes the local pizza called pide.

With its quiet spots for picnics and walking and its excellent beaches Ünye is one of the nicest holiday towns on the eastern Black Sea coast. Affordable pensions and camping facilities as well as 2- or 3-star hotels can be found in the summer season. There are summer festivals and concerts in July.

Etymology
The town's name has evolved from the Greek Oinoe through Oinaion, Unieh, Unie and Unia to the current Ünye.

History
The history of Ünye goes back to the Hittite period in the 15th century BC, followed by the Kashkas, Scythians, Milesians, Persians, Pontus and Ancient Roman/Byzantine eras. During Greco-Roman times, it was called Oenoe and was a port town of Pontus, at the mouth of the river Genius.

It was also ruled by Danishmends between 1086 and 1098, 1141-1144 and 1150–1157, Sultanate of Rum between 1188 and 1204, 1214-1228 and 1230–1243, Empire of Trebizond in 1204–1214, 1228–1230, 1243-1297 and 1302-1346 and Emirate of Hacıemiroğlu between 1297-1302 and 1346–1461.

During the 1290s, the Ünye fortress was built by the Trebizond emperor Ioanni (II.).

In the year 1806 the Laz attacked Ünye. This led to the town being evacuated under the guidance of Bishop Meletios and resetting in Sinope.

Main sights
 The 18th-century town hall.
 Çamlık - picnic area in a wood overlooking the sea
 Çakırtepe - a hilltop view of the town
 Ünye Castle (dating back to the Pontus era).
 Uzunkum - the longest beach on the Black Sea

Notable natives
 Fahrettin Çiloğlu, writer and translator
 Ferhan Şensoy, actor and writer
 Gulsen, artist
 Refaiddin Şahin State Minister-MP, has attracted government spending to Ünye
 Tamer Karan, singer
 Osman Doğan, Ünye Tarihi uzmanı
 İrfan Dağdelen, Ünye Tarihi uzmanı
 Sabri Bacacı, Ünye Tarihi uzmanı

References

External links

Municipal Official Site 
District Official Site 
News & City Portal 

Historical Information Page 
Places to be Visited 
City Football Club (Ünyespor) 

Populated places in Ordu Province
Black Sea port cities and towns in Turkey
Fishing communities in Turkey
Populated coastal places in Turkey
Districts of Ordu Province